Oakland University Baseball Field is a baseball venue in Rochester, Michigan, United States.  It is home to the Oakland Golden Grizzlies baseball team of the NCAA Division I Horizon League.  The field has a capacity of 500 spectators.  It features a natural grass surface, dugouts, batting cages, and an elevated right field fence.

See also
 List of NCAA Division I baseball venues

References 

College baseball venues in the United States
Baseball venues in Michigan
Oakland Golden Grizzlies baseball